Climax is a city in Polk County, Minnesota, United States. It is part of the Grand Forks, ND-MN Metropolitan Statistical Area. The population was 243 at the 2020 census.

Geography
It is located on the Sand Hill River, which joins the Red River of the North about two miles (3 km) to the west.

U.S. Highway 75 and Minnesota Highway 220 are two of the main routes in the community.

Demographics

2010 census
As of the census of 2010, there were 267 people, 112 households, and 63 families living in the city. The racial makeup of the city was 94.4% White, 1.9% African American, 0.7% Native American, 1.1% from other races, and 1.9% from two or more races. Hispanic or Latino of any race were 6.7% of the population.

There were 112 households, of which 35.7% had children under the age of 18 living with them, 39.3% were married couples living together, 12.5% had a female householder with no husband present, 4.5% had a male householder with no wife present, and 43.8% were non-families. 39.3% of all households were made up of individuals, and 11.6% had someone living alone who was 65 years of age or older. The average household size was 2.38 and the average family size was 3.30.

The median age in the city was 32.1 years. 31.1% of residents were under the age of 18; 6.3% were between the ages of 18 and 24; 26.6% were from 25 to 44; 25.1% were from 45 to 64; and 10.9% were 65 years of age or older. The gender makeup of the city was 51.3% male and 48.7% female.

2000 census
As of the census of 2000, there were 243 people, 113 households, and 68 families living in the city. The racial makeup of the city was 93.00% White, 1.65% Native American, 4.12% from other races, and 1.23% from two or more races. Hispanic or Latino of any race were 6.58% of the population.

There were 113 households, out of which 25.7% had children under the age of 18 living with them, 49.6% were married couples living together, 7.1% had a female householder with no husband present, and 39.8% were non-families. 38.9% of all households were made up of individuals, and 22.1% had someone living alone who was 65 years of age or older.  The average household size was 2.15 and the average family size was 2.82.

In the city, the population was spread out, with 22.2% under the age of 18, 7.8% from 18 to 24, 23.0% from 25 to 44, 21.8% from 45 to 64, and 25.1% who were 65 years of age or older.  The median age was 44 years. For every 100 females, there were 88.4 males.  For every 100 females age 18 and over, there were 90.9 males.

The median income for a household in the city was $24,688, and the median income for a family was $30,625. Males had a median income of $38,438 versus $20,000 for females. The per capita income for the city was $14,320.  About 5.1% of families and 11.8% of the population were below the poverty line, including 14.1% of those under the age of eighteen and 20.3% of those 65 or over.

Name
Climax, founded in 1896, was named after a chewing tobacco company. The town's name has been a source of humor, and the slogan selected for the centennial was "Climax.  More than just a feeling."  Less well attested is the assertion that some unnamed local newspaper, reporting the death of a resident of a nearby town, ran a report of her passing under the headline Fertile Woman dies in Climax.

References

Cities in Minnesota
Cities in Polk County, Minnesota